Teya Plamenova Penkova (born 8 September 1999) is a Bulgarian footballer who plays as a midfielder for the Bulgaria women's national team.

International career
Penkova capped for Bulgaria at senior level in a 3–0 friendly win against Luxembourg on 20 September 2020.

References

1999 births
Living people
Bulgarian women's footballers
Women's association football midfielders
FC NSA Sofia players
Bulgaria women's international footballers